The First Dollfuss government was sworn in on 20 May 1932 and was replaced on 21 September 1933.

Composition

References

Politics of Austria
Dollfuss 
1932 establishments in Austria
1933 disestablishments in Austria